Krokhin or Krohin is a Russian male surname, its feminine counterpart is Krokhina or Krohina. Notable people with the surname include:

Lyudmila Krokhina (born 1954), Russian rower
Vitaly Krokhin (born 1947), Russian handball coach

Russian-language surnames